The cockade of Peru is a popular unofficial symbol of the Peruvian nation. While an 1825 law decreed its characteristics, there is no official regulation concerning its use, and it is not recognised as a national symbol in the Peruvian Constitution. It has the same colors as the national flag: red-white-red. It is often worn as a badge on the chest during Independence Day parades and other events of the day.

External links
 Peru: symbols and customs, a review.

Peru
National symbols of Peru